"Sold Out Dates" is a song by American rapper Gunna, featuring vocals from American rapper Lil Baby. It was released on April 17, 2018. After the song leaked, Gunna decided to release it due to positive fan and critical reception. The song was produced by Turbo and Ghetto Guitar. The flow and cadence in the song made it interpolated later in the year on American rapper and singer Travis Scott's single, "Yosemite", which features Gunna alongside Canadian rapper Nav.

Composition
The song uses a "booming 808" with guitar loops in a trap beat, and finds the rappers narrating the riches from their successes. In the chorus and first verse, Gunna sings about his luxurious ways ("Addicted to sex, I gotta get laid / My jacket Off-White, don't mean that it's beige / I clean that real nice, I don't got a maid / Ape in the night, I'm still rocking Bape"). Lil Baby recollects on hanging out with Gunna and his life: "Me and young Gunna back at it again / We just in New York, double datin' with twins / I just bought a Wraith, I retired the Benz / I fired my bitch and I hired her friend".

Charts

Certifications

References

2018 singles
2018 songs
Gunna (rapper) songs
Lil Baby songs
Song recordings produced by Turbo (record producer)
Songs written by Gunna (rapper)
Songs written by Lil Baby
Songs written by Turbo (record producer)